Nainwal is a village located in Manesar Tehsil of Gurgaon district in Haryana, India. Its Pincode is 122051. It is situated 2 km away from sub-district headquarter Manesar and 19 km away from district headquarter Gurgaon.

The total geographical area of village is 410 hectares. Nainwal has a total population of 987 peoples. There are about 179 houses in Nainwal village

Schools
 Government Primary School, Nainwal
 R.N. Public School, Nainwal

Tourism
Agro/Rural tourism, a new theme concept is expending broadly is India. Aravali Jungle Park is an example in this village.

References

Villages in Gurgaon district